Alexander Thom (10 October 1894 – 1 October 1973) was a Scottish footballer who played for Dumbarton, Kilmarnock, Ayr United, Motherwell, Morton, Airdrieonians, Hull City and
Swindon Town.

References

1894 births
1973 deaths
Scottish footballers
Dumbarton F.C. players
Kilmarnock F.C. wartime guest players
Ayr United F.C. wartime guest players
Motherwell F.C. wartime guest players
Airdrieonians F.C. (1878) players
Swindon Town F.C. players
Scottish Football League players
English Football League players
Greenock Morton F.C. players
Hull City A.F.C. players
Association football outside forwards